The African Continental Cycling Championships are a series of cycling races held annually in Africa where the African cyclists decide who will be the champion for the year to come. They have been held since 2001.

Editions

Men

Road Race

U23 Road Race

Time Trial

U23 Time Trial

Team Time Trial

Women

Road Race

Time Trial

Team Time Trial

Mixed team time trial

References

External links 
 

Cycle racing in Africa
UCI Africa Tour races
Under-23 cycle racing
Recurring sporting events established in 2001